Renat Mamashev (born March 31, 1983) is a Russian former professional ice hockey defenceman who last played for Admiral Vladivostok of the Kontinental Hockey League (KHL). He has most notably played for HC Neftekhimik Nizhnekamsk of the KHL.

After 16 professional seasons in Russia and at the conclusion of the 2017–18 season, Mamashev announced his retirement from hockey on August 9, 2018.

Career statistics

References

External links

1983 births
Living people
Ice hockey people from Moscow
Admiral Vladivostok players
HC Dynamo Moscow players
HC Sarov players
Krylya Sovetov Moscow players
Metallurg Magnitogorsk players
Moose Jaw Warriors players
HC Neftekhimik Nizhnekamsk players
HC Sibir Novosibirsk players
HC Sochi players
Tatar people of Russia
Tatar sportspeople
Torpedo Nizhny Novgorod players
Traktor Chelyabinsk players
Russian ice hockey defencemen